Saline Township is one of the eight townships located in Perry County, Missouri, in the United States of America.

Name
Saline Township was named for Saline Creek, which flows through the township. The creek's name comes from two natural salt springs which were used as a source of salt for Native American tribes and early French colonial settlers.

History
Saline Township is situated in the northwestern part of Perry County. It was organized between 1850 and 1860. There is one village in Saline Township: Lithium, and one CDP: Brewer.

Demographics

2010 Census
As of the census of 2010, there were 1,610 people living in the township. The racial makeup of the township was 98.8% White, 0.1% American Indian and Alaska Native, 0.3% Asian, 0.5% from other races. There are 36 people per square mile (population density). The median age is 39.5. The US median is 37.3. 63.43% of people in Saline Township are married. 10.70% are divorced.

The average household size is 2.67 people. 34.14% of people are married, with children. 9.41% have children, but are single.

Other Saline Townships
The Geographic Names Information System (GNIS) lists five Saline Townships in various counties of Missouri.

References

Townships in Perry County, Missouri